Baithalangso Assembly constituency is one of the 126 constituencies of the Assam Legislative Assembly in India. Baithalangso is in  West Karbi Anglong district of Assam and forms a part of the Autonomous District Lok Sabha constituency. This seat is reserved for the Scheduled Tribes (ST).

Town Details 

Following are the details of Baithalangso:

 Country: India.
 State: Assam.
 District: West Karbi Anglong.
 Lok Sabha Constituency: Autonomous District Lok Sabha/Parliamentary constituency.
 Assembly Categorisation: Rural.
 Literacy Level: 86.31%.
 Eligible Electors as per 2021 General Elections: 2,10,481. Eligible Electors. Male Electors:1,07,129. Female Electors:1,03,352.
 Geographic Co-Ordinates: 25°51'10.8"N 92°26'46.7"E.
 Total Area Covered: 2998 square kilometres.
 Area Includes:  Baithalangso thana in Hamren sub-division of West Karbi Anglong district.
 Inter State Border : West Karbi Anglong.
 Number Of Polling Stations: Year 2011–235,Year 2016–246,Year 2021–20.

Members of Legislative Assembly 
 1967: Dhaniram Rongpi, Indian National Congress.
 1972: Dhaniram Rongpi, Indian National Congress.
 1978: Dhaniram Rongpi, Indian National Congress.
 1983: Dhaniram Rongpi, Indian National Congress.
 1985: Holiram Terang, Independent.
 1991: Holiram Terang, Autonomous State Demand Committee.
 1996: Holiram Terang, Autonomous State Demand Committee.
 2001: Ruponsing Ronghang, Indian National Congress.
 2006: Dr. Mansing Rongpi, Indian National Congress.
 2011: Dr. Mansing Rongpi, Indian National Congress.
 2016: Dr. Mansing Rongpi, Indian National Congress.
 2016 (by-election): Dr. Mansing Rongpi, Bharatiya Janata Party.
 2021: Rupsing Teron, Bharatiya Janata Party.

Election results

2021 result

2016 by-election

2016 result

2011 result

See also
 Autonomous District Lok Sabha constituency
 West Karbi Anglong district

External links

References

Assembly constituencies of Assam
West Karbi Anglong district